Tepidimonas thermarum is a Gram-negative, strictly aerobic, oxidase- and catalase-positive, slightly thermophilic, rod-shaped, motile bacterium with a single polar flagellum from the genus Tepidimonas, which was isolated from the Elisenquelle in Aachen.

References

External links
Type strain of Tepidimonas thermarum at BacDive -  the Bacterial Diversity Metadatabase

Comamonadaceae
Bacteria described in 2007